Dyschirius kryzhanovskii is a species of ground beetle in the subfamily Scaritinae. It was described by Gryuntal in 1984.

References

kryzhanovskii
Beetles described in 1984